Dr. José Rodolfo Galvele (March 10, 1937 – July 31, 2011) was an Argentine chemist.

His research focus was on the mechanism of intergranular corrosion of aluminum-copper alloys and on the pitting of metals. He proposed a mechanism of stress corrosion cracking 

He was awarded the Konex award in 2003.

Galvele was the first dean of Instituto Sabato from 1993 to 2007.

Books 
Jorge A. Sabato, creador de la metalurgia en CNEA : ¿cómo se hace para crear un laboratorio de excelencia? (November 2009). Inst. de 
Tecnología Professor Jorge A. Sabato, 
Degradación de materiales I : corrosión (2006). Jorge Baudino Eds.,

References

External links 
 

1937 births
2011 deaths
Argentine chemists
University of Buenos Aires alumni